Ratris Khel Chale is a Marathi supernatural thriller drama serial which aired on Zee Marathi from 22 February 2016. The serial revolves around the Naik family talking in a Malvani and living in Sawantwadi village, who experience strange and unexplainable events.

Series

Plot 
Hari "Anna" Naik, head of an influential Malvani family, abruptly dies on the day of his youngest son's engagement. This leads to issues in the household due to property distribution between the heirs, especially due to Sushma "Sushlya", Anna's illegitimate daughter from another woman, Shevanta. Also, the household witnesses strange paranormal events and mysteries, which some believe to be supernatural, while others believe to be tricks.
 
Anna's right hand Natha and his wife Yamuna create paranormal events to scare the Naiks and usurp their property. Also Sushma creates problems and haunts up events in the Naik house to get her inheritance rights after Anna's death and retrieve Shevanta's jewellery. All heirs to Anna's property try to get the largest share of the property.
 
Neelima creates haunting scenes to get Anna's property for her commitment to her employer for money. Also Anna's friends Nene, a lawyer and Raghu Kaka, a priest with an evil mind and evil deeds set their eyes on Anna's property so they too scare the family. Neelima and her employer, Jatin Sheth assassinate Nene Vakil as he learns their truth.

Cast 
 Shakuntala Nare as Indumati "Mai" Hari Naik, Anna's kind hearted widow. Madhav, Chhaya, and Abhiram's mother, Datta's adopted mother and Sushma's stepmother, Neelima, Sarita, and Devika's mother-in-law and Archis, Purva, and Ganesh's grandmother.
 Suhas Shirsat as Dattaram "Datta" Hari Naik, Anna's second son, from a second unseen woman but still raised as Indu's own, the most responsible member of the Naik family after Anna. Sarita's husband, Purva and Ganesh's father, the unseen mistress' biological son.
 Mangesh Salvi as Madhav Hari Naik, Anna's eldest son who moves to Mumbai for work. Neelima's husband and Archis's father. He is an imaginative man who dabbles in poetry and novel writing, most of which often comes true with the Naik family.
 Ashwini Mukadam as Sarita Dattaram Naik, the only second generation mistress in the house to lovingly take care of the Naik house. Datta's wife, Purva and Ganesh's mother.
 Prachi Sukhathankar as Neelima Madhav Naik, Madhav's spouse who is highly scientific and disregards any superstitions of the native village people. Madhav's wife and Archis's mother. She assassinated Nene Vakil for Anna's property.
 Madhav Abhyankar as Hari "Anna" Naik, a formidable elderly man as well as the most influential person in the village. Indumati and Shevanta's husband. Madhav, Datta, Chhaya, Abhiram, and Sushma's father.
 Sainkeet Kamat as Abhiram Hari Naik, Anna's youngest son whose engagement was planned but Anna died on the same day, postponing it. Devika's husband.
 Rutuja Dharmadhikari as Sushma "Sushlya" Hari Naik, Shevanta's daughter who wants to take away all the Naik family's property as a desire of her late mother after Anna's death. She was disowned by her stepmother Indumati after Shevanta's death, but Natha and Yamuna adopt her to get Anna's property.
 Namrata Pawaskar as Chhaya Hari Naik, Anna's third child and only daughter, whose husband died on the night of their wedding, leaving her widowed and to live in her parents' home. Madhav and Abhiram's sister. Datta, Pandu, and Sushma's adoptive and step sister, respectively.
 Dilip Bapat as Advocate Nene, who always saved Anna after he had committed any crime and helped him acquire properties, while secretly taking some parts of it. After Anna's death, Nene looks after the property distribution between Anna's heirs.
 Anil Gawade as Raghunath "Raghu" Gurav, who is the Gurav of the village, often called by the Naiks whenever any paranormal event occurs. He also eyes Anna's property. He always practices Black Magic in the name of holy commotion.
 Pralhad Kudtarkar as Pandu, a man cared for by the Naiks who forgets almost everything he hears or sees, since he witnessed his father's death by Anna. Indumati and Anna's adoptive son. He knows many secrets of Naik family from the past and the present also. He is not taken seriously by anyone because he always forget everything.
 Prajakta Wadaye as Police Constable who arrests Neelima in the last episode.
 Hemant Joshi as Jatin Sheth, an unscrupulous businessman who wants to grow his empire in the village with Neelima.
 Pooja Gore as Purva Dattaram Naik, Sarita and Datta's younger child.
 Nupur Chitale as Devika Abhiram Naik, Abhiram's wife.
 Abhishek Gaonkar as Ganesh Dattaram Naik, Sarita and Datta's elder child.
 Nachiket Devasthali as Vishwasrao, Police Inspector and Abhiram's friend.
 Adish Vaidya as Archis Madhav Naik, Neelima and Madhav's son.

Production 
Season 1 was remade in Kannada and telecasted on Zee Kannada as well. Later in late 2018, Zee Marathi and the production house confirmed the production of Ratris Khel Chale 2. Ratris Khel Chale's both seasons were dubbed into Hindi as Raat Ka Khel Saara and telecasted on And TV from 29 February 2020 on Saturday - Sunday at 8 p.m. of 1 hour episode which also got positive response amongst audience and Season 2 from 12 December 2020.

The production and filming of series took place in Akeri, Maharashtra in Konkan Region. The Season 1 of this show was supposed to be based on horror, but was later shifted to thriller crime as people from the Konkan region accused the promotion of series to have bad effect on the region's reputation and even a court case was filed.

Controversy 
The Konkan team had objected to the series saying that the series was promoting superstition and showing Konkan a scary place.

Reception 
The series premiered on 22 February 2016 from Monday to Saturday at 10.30 pm by replacing Dil Dosti Duniyadari.

Ratings

Awards

References

External links 
 
 Ratris Khel Chale at ZEE5

Zee Marathi original programming
Marathi-language television shows
2010s supernatural television series
Thriller television series
2016 Indian television series debuts
2016 Indian television series endings